St. Ann Highlands is an unincorporated community and a census-designated place (CDP) located in and governed by Boulder County, Colorado, United States. The CDP is a part of the Boulder, CO Metropolitan Statistical Area. The population of the St. Ann Highlands CDP was 288 at the United States Census 2010. The Nederland post office (Zip Code 80466) serves the area.

Geography
It occupies a ridge between the valleys of North Boulder Creek and Middle Boulder Creek. State Highway 119 forms the southern edge of the CDP, connecting Nederland to the west with Boulder  to the east.

Geography

Demographics

See also

Outline of Colorado
Index of Colorado-related articles
State of Colorado
Colorado cities and towns
Colorado census designated places
Colorado counties
Boulder County, Colorado
Colorado metropolitan areas
Front Range Urban Corridor
North Central Colorado Urban Area
Denver-Aurora-Boulder, CO Combined Statistical Area
Boulder, CO Metropolitan Statistical Area

References

External links

Boulder County website

Census-designated places in Boulder County, Colorado
Census-designated places in Colorado
Denver metropolitan area